Calendic acid (sometimes α-calendic acid) is an unsaturated fatty acid, named for the pot marigold (Calendula officinalis), from which it is obtained. It is chemically similar to the conjugated linoleic acids; laboratory work suggests it may have similar in vitro bioactivities.

Biosynthesis
Calendic acid is an omega-6 fatty acid. though not usually listed with this group.  Calendic acid is synthesised in Calendula officinalis from linoleate by an unusual Δ12-oleate desaturase (a FAD 2 variant) that converts the cis-double bond at position 9 to a trans,trans-conjugated double bond system. An all-trans beta isomer has been described.

Effects
Calendic acid is the fatty acid responsible for the reduction in feed intake and improved feed utilization in mice when calendula oil is added to the feedstuff, as demonstrated by the comparative experiments in the examples using corn oil.

References

Fatty acids
Alkenoic acids
Polyenes